Pfammatter is a surname. Notable people with the surname include: 

 Hans-Peter Pfammatter (born 1974), Swiss jazz pianist and composer
 Kurt Pfammatter (1941–2022), Swiss ice hockey player